The Rice–Texas football rivalry is an American college football rivalry between the Rice Owls and Texas Longhorns.  Texas leads the series 74–21–1 through the 2021 season.  

Rice has won only twice since 1960.  17 of the 21 Rice wins came between 1930 and 1960, a span over which it enjoyed a slight edge over the Longhorns.

Game results

John F. Kennedy speech

On September 12, 1962, Rice Stadium hosted the speech in which President John F. Kennedy challenged Americans to meet his goal, set the previous year, to send a man to the Moon by the end of the decade. In the speech, he used a reference to Rice University football to help frame his rhetoric:
But why, some say, the Moon? Why choose this as our goal? And they may well ask, why climb the highest mountain? Why, 35 years ago, fly the Atlantic? Why does Rice play Texas? We choose to go to the Moon! We choose to go to the Moon in this decade and do the other things, not because they are easy, but because they are hard, because that goal will serve to organize and measure the best of our energies and skills, because that challenge is one that we are willing to accept, one we are unwilling to postpone, and one which we intend to win, and the others, too.

See also  
 List of NCAA college football rivalry games

References

College football rivalries in the United States
Rice Owls football
Texas Longhorns football
1914 establishments in Texas